Afraid of Heights may refer to:

Afraid of Heights (Wavves album), and title track on that album
Afraid of Heights (Billy Talent album), 2016
"Afraid of Heights" (song), the title track from the album above
Afraid of Heights, a mixtape by Omen